
Year 320 (CCCXX) was a leap year starting on Friday (link will display the full calendar) of the Julian calendar. At the time, it was known as the Year of the Consulship of Constantinus and Constantinus (or, less frequently, year 1073 Ab urbe condita). The denomination 320 for this year has been used since the early medieval period, when the Anno Domini calendar era became the prevalent method in Europe for naming years.

Events 
 By place 
 Roman Empire 
 Crispus, eldest son of Constantine I, leads a victorious campaign against the Franks, assuring twenty years of peace along the Rhine frontier. He establishes his residence in Augusta Treverorum (modern Trier), capital of Germania.
 Licinius reneges on the religious freedom promised by the Edict of Milan, and begins a new persecution of Christians in the Eastern Roman Empire. He imprisons Christians, confiscates their properties and destroys churches.

 Asia 
 King Chandragupta I founds the Gupta dynasty in northern India.
 Zhang Shi (張寔), Zhang Duke of Xiping and governor of Liang Province, (涼州)is assassinated by Yan She (閻涉) and Zhao Ang (趙卬) and replaced by Zhang Mao (張茂), commonly accepted first ruler of the Chinese state Former Liang.

 By topic 
 Art 
 Construction begins on the Old St. Peter's Basilica, Rome (approximate date).

 Culture and Religion 
 In Nydam Mose (Denmark), the Nydam oak boat is sacrificed by the Danes (the boat is excavated in the 1830s, when a local farmer finds weapons, including swords and spears).  
 December 25 is introduced as the birthday of Jesus.

 Science 
 October 18 – Pappus of Alexandria, Greek philosopher, observes an eclipse of the sun and writes a commentary on The Great Astronomer (Almagest).

Births 
 Aurelius Victor, Roman historian and politician (approximate date)
 Constans I, Roman emperor (d. 350)
 Flavian I, Patriarch of Antioch (d. 404)
 Jin Jianwendi, emperor of the Jin Dynasty (d. 372)
 Oribasius, Greek physician (approximate date)
 Tuoba Shiyijian, prince of the Tuoba Dai (d. 376)
 Xie An, statesman of the Jin Dynasty (d. 385)

Deaths 

 January 2 – Narcissus, Argeus, and Marcellinus, Roman Catholic martyrs and saints
 January 29 – Valerius of Trèves, Roman Catholic priest and saint
 February 6 – Dorothea of Alexandria, Roman Catholic virgin, martyr and saint
 March 9 – 40 Martyrs of Sebaste
 March 10 – Cyrion and Candidus, Armenian Orthodox priest and saints
 July 11 – Januarius and Pelagia, Roman Catholic priests, martyrs and saints
 November 29 – Saint Illuminata, Roman Catholic religious sister and saint
 December 9 – Proculus of Verona, Roman Catholic priest and saint

Date unknown 
 Lactantius, Christian writer (approximate date)
 Sima Bao, prince of the Jin Dynasty (b. 294)
 Zhang Shi, Duke of Xiping

References